The QF 4-inch gun Mark XXIII was introduced in late 1945 as a deck gun for Royal Navy submarines. It was the last type of gun to be fitted to British submarines, finally being retired in 1974.

Development and service
Development of the Mark XXIII began in 1942, as a lighter replacement for the QF 4-inch gun Mark XXII, which was based on a gun introduced in 1911. It was too late to see service in World War II, but was fitted to Amphion-class submarines that completed after October 1945. It was also fitted to some T-class submarines.

Between 1955 and the early 1960s, the Amphion-class boats were modernised with new streamlined conning towers and casings. This work included the removal of the deck gun, although the underlying supports for the gun mountings were retained in case they were required. This facility was put to use during the British involvement in the Indonesia–Malaysia confrontation from 1962 to 1966, when the flotilla of Amphion-class submarines which were deployed in the conflict were again fitted with Mark XXIII guns. These were used to counter blockade-running Indonesian junks and other small vessels. HMS Andrew retained her gun into the 1970s; the last firing was on 2 December 1974.

Surviving examples
HMS Andrew's Mark XXIII gun is preserved at the Royal Navy Submarine Museum, Gosport.

References

External links
 Technical drawing of the 4-in. QF MARK XXIII Gun on 4-in. S2 (Submarine) Mounting (John Lambert Plans and Drawings)
 HMS Andrew gun removal, 1975 photograph on Flickr.

Naval guns of the United Kingdom
100 mm artillery
World War II naval weapons of the United Kingdom